The Feather is a 1929 British romantic drama film directed by Leslie S. Hiscott, based on the 1927 novel of the same name by Charlotte Mary Matheson, and starring Jameson Thomas, Véra Flory, Randle Ayrton and Mary Clare. It was made as a silent film with added sound effects and music. It was made by the independent producer Julius Hagen at Elstree Studios.

Cast
 Jameson Thomas as Roger Dalton 
 Véra Flory as Mavis Cottrell 
 Randle Ayrton as Rizzio 
 Mary Clare as Mrs. Dalton 
 W. Cronin Wilson as Mr. Cottrell 
 James Reardon as Quint 
 Charles Paton as Professor Vivian 
 Irene Tripod as Mrs. Higgins 
 Grace Lane as Nun

References

External links

1929 films
British romantic drama films
1929 romantic drama films
1920s English-language films
Films directed by Leslie S. Hiscott
Films shot at British International Pictures Studios
British silent feature films
Films based on British novels
British black-and-white films
1920s British films
Silent romantic drama films